The 2014 Marion Blue Racers season was the fourth season for the Continental Indoor Football League (CIFL) franchise.

In May 2013, the Blue Racers announced that they were leaving the CIFL again, this time to join the Xtreme Indoor Football League. The league was supposed to be run by Blue Racers owner LaMonte Coleman. However, in August 2013, the Blue Racers re-signed with the CIFL to a multi-year contract. Coleman has hired Marc Huddleston as the 2014 Head Coach and Director of Football Operations. After a 5–1 start, the Blue Racers announced that Coleman would be taking over as the team's head coach. The Blue Racers recovered from a down season in 2013, by winning the CIFL's new South Division title, clinching them home-field advantage in the South Division playoffs. The Blue Racers faced off against the Northern Kentucky River Monsters in the South Division title game and won 56–40. With the win over Northern Kentucky, the Blue Racers clinched their second berth in the CIFL Championship Game. After three quarters of play, the Blue Racers were tied at 26 with the Erie Explosion in the 2014 CIFL Championship Game when Aaron Smentanka found Evan Twombly for a score. After Marion turned over the ball on downs, Richard Stokes scored again for the Explosion, which turned out to be the final score of the game, making the score 38–26.

Roster

Schedule

Regular season

*The Columbus War Eagles played a fill in game for the Port Huron Patriots, who forfeited the final 3 games of the season.

Standings

Postseason

Coaching staff

References

2014 Continental Indoor Football League season
Marion Blue Racers
Marion Blue Racers